Peregrine Financial Group Inc., commonly known as PFGBest, was an Iowa-based financial firm that operated for over 20 years. It was shut down in July 2012 after it was put under investigation for a $200 million shortfall in customer funds. Peregrine’s chief executive, Russell R. Wasendorf Sr., was arrested and charged with making false statements to the Commodity Futures Trading Commission (CFTC).

The firm filed for bankruptcy on July 10, while listing more than $500 million in assets and over $100 million in liabilities.

Company history

During the mid to late-1990s, Peregrine Financial Group's office at the Chicago Mercantile Exchange had closed-circuit security cameras on the sales floor which is not and was not a common practice in the Chicago futures brokerage community while also recording all broker telephone lines.

Embezzlement of customer funds

Wasendorf attempted to commit suicide before his arrest and wrote in a confession letter that he had been "using a scheme of false bank statements to embezzle millions of dollars from customer accounts over a period of about 20 years." Congressional hearings questioned why the CFTC had not caught the embezzlement earlier and "the agency’s failure to adequately oversee the National Futures Association, the self-regulatory organization directly responsible for overseeing Peregrine." The firm had been moved by Wasendorf from Chicago in 2009 to a new 18 million dollar building in Cedar Falls, Iowa.

In August 2012, Wasendorf was indicted on "31 counts of lying to regulators.... [He] ... could face up to 155 years in prison and a $7.8 million fine. [He] allegedly stole as much as $215 million from customers over a 20-year period." He pleaded guilty to all charges, and in January 2013 federal judge Linda Reade sentenced him to 50 years of prison.

Litigation
The  CFTC filed a criminal complaint in Cedar Rapids against the Cedar Falls firm Peregrine Financial Group, Inc., and Russell R. Wasendorf, Sr.

Wasendorf was also sued on July 13 by Michael LaSalvia of Naperville, Illinois, who sought class action status for his suit against the CEO and his son. LaSilvia also alleged that Wasendorf had mixed client and firm money. Another client separately sued Wasendorf as well as other company executives in Chicago.

On July 27, attorneys for the 1970s rock band The Knack sent a cease and desist letter to Wasendorf and his already shut Italian restaurant MyVerona in Cedar Falls, Iowa, demanding he stop using a recording of the band's smash hit "My Sharona" in the restaurant's advertising. The song, with a chorus modified to "M-M-M-My Verona," had been used for years as a theme song on the company website. "The Composition is one of the most popular songs of all time, and companies pay our client significant sums for the right to obtain a license for the use of the composition," the letter said.

Liquidation
Michael Eidelman, the receiver for Wasendorf in the bankruptcy of PFGBest, is tracking assets which may be linked to Wasendorf's corporate actions including a $100,000 personal wine collection, a high-end Italian restaurant in Cedar Falls, a jet, and two residences with $1 million estimated value.

The bankruptcy filing specified between 10,000 and 25,000 creditors. The trustee for the firm, Ira Bodenstein, started with the court by identifying 11 clients, primarily owners of warehouse receipts for precious metals, of about 24,000 futures customers with specifically identifiable property eligible to be returned to them.

Recovery of Customer Funds
As of December 2014, customers were in line to recover 44% of funds held at the firm.

Media Coverage
Peregrine Financial Group CEO's attempted suicide and his confession to a massive fraud was covered as a documentary on CNBC's American Greed show as Episode 87 under the title "The Falcon & the Con Man"

References

External links
Last Days - The Fall of Peregrine, Wall Street Journal, video 12m19s, August 13, 2012
PFGBest - Will Clients Recover Any Funds?, Christian Financial Radio Network, article, January 8, 2014

Fraud in the United States
Financial scandals
Defunct financial services companies of the United States